The Desert Eagle is a gas-operated semi-automatic pistol.

Desert Eagle may also refer to:

Desert Eagle (album), a 2002 album by C-Bo
Desert Eagle Volume 1, a 2008 album by Sole
Desert Eagle Observatory, an amateur observatory in Arizona, United States
Olympic Desert Eagle, an American homebuilt aircraft